Prek Prasab Wildlife Sanctuary (Khmer: ដែនជម្រកសត្វព្រៃ​ព្រែក​ប្រសព្វ) is a 12,770 ha protected area in eastern Cambodia, located in Kratié province. The area was formally protected in October 2018.

The area is of particular importance for the endangered hog deer, (Axis porcinus), with an estimated population 84 individuals. Hog deer were thought extinct in Cambodia until the 2006 rediscovery of a population in this area. The protected area is under threat from illegal forest clearance, snaring, and poaching with dogs.

References 

Wildlife sanctuaries of Cambodia
Protected areas of Cambodia